Royal Air Force Hutton Cranswick or more simply RAF Hutton Cranswick is a former Royal Air Force station located to the south of Driffield and immediately south west of the village of Hutton Cranswick  in the East Riding of Yorkshire, England. The station was developed as a fighter base with many Spitfire fighter squadrons passing through. It was used by the Royal Air Force, the Royal Canadian Air Force (RCAF), and several Polish Fighter Squadrons of the RAF. It was opened in 1942, and disposed of in 1946.

History
RAF Hutton Cranswick opened in January 1942 as a fighter airfield within No. 12 Group RAF. No. 4 Group of Bomber Command had recently taken over RAF Leconfield to the south, which had previously been a Fighter Command asset, so Hutton Cranswick was developed for the fighter element. Uncharacteristically for the time, its three runways were concreted from the beginning. Many Fighter Command airfields were initially built with grass runways which were later upgraded to concrete.

Fighter Command was renowned for rotating its squadrons through several bases in quick succession, and RAF Hutton Cranswick is a prime example of this. Many squadrons rotated through the airfield including; No. 1 Squadron RAF, 19, 168, 170, 195, 234, 302 (City of Poznan), 306 (City of Torun), 308 (City of Kraków), 315 (City of Dęblin), 316 (City of Warsaw), and 610 squadrons. In early 1943, several flights were posted into Hutton Cranswick, including No. 3 RAF Regiment Training School (which became No. 1634 Flight). This was moved from RAF Ronaldsway where targets were towed to train the RAF Regiment in anti-aircraft fire.

In September 1943, virtually the entire strength of squadron personnel were posted to Australia to form No. 549 Squadron RAF, and No. 234 reformed with new crews, which were posted to the south of England, by the end of 1943. From 1 December 1943, the Anti Aircraft Co-operation 291 Squadron was formed at the airfield for target towing and similar uses. No. 291 Squadron had been formed from 1613, 1629, and 1634 anti-aircraft co-operation flights, and its remit was to tow aerial targets for the anti-aircraft batteries on the east coast.

In December 1943, No. 26 Squadron RAF arrived from Church Fenton. The squadron first departed for RAF Scorton, but returned, then left for RAF Peterhead, returning again in April 1944 (from RAF Ayr), and finally left Hutton Cranswick for good on 28 April 1944 for Lee-on-Solent.

Whilst in use by 291 other fighter squadrons continued to rotate through including 401, 403, 412, 441, 442, 443 (all flying Supermarine Spitfires) and 439 using Hawker Typhoons. The final unit to operate from Hutton Cranswick was No. 124 Squadron RAF using Spitfire IXs.

Hutton Cranswick was used by No. 16 Armament Practice Camp RAF for about a year until it finally closed in mid 1946.

Units
A number of other units also used the airfield:

Post closure
In April 1964, a Mk2 Lightning tried to effect an emergency landing at Hutton Cranswick due to fuel shortage and systems failure. The aircraft's home base was at RAF Leconfield, just to the south, however, it was unable to reach that airfield safely.

The site is now used for farming and light industrial work, whilst the control tower has been converted into a private residence, and the airfield battle headquarters bunker still remains in a field behind the old control tower.

References

Sources

External links
Map from 1953 showing location of airfield (extreme bottom left)

Hutt
Buildings and structures in the East Riding of Yorkshire
Hutt